The Korean Basketball League Most Improved Player Award (MIP) (Korean: 기량발전상) is an annual Korean Basketball League (KBL) award given since 1997 to the player who was deemed to have made the most improvement compared to the previous season.

Winners

1997 to 2010–11

2014–15 to present
The award was scrapped after the 2010–11 season and revived for the 2014–15 season.

Notes

References

External links
Records: Past records / 주요기록: 역대수상현황 on the Korean Basketball League official website 

Awards established in 1997
Most improved awards
Korean Basketball League awards